Qillqata (Aymara qillqaña to write, -ta a suffix, "written" or "something written", also spelled Khellkhata) is a mountain in the Bolivian Andes which reaches a height of approximately . It is located in the Cochabamba Department, Quillacollo Province, Quillacollo Municipality. Qillqata lies southeast of Uqi Salli Punta.

References 

Mountains of Cochabamba Department